Justin Cronin (born 1962) is an American author. He has written five novels: Mary and O'Neil and The Summer Guest, as well as a vampire trilogy consisting of The Passage, The Twelve and City of Mirrors. He has won the Hemingway Foundation/PEN Award, the Stephen Crane Prize, and a Whiting Award.

Born and raised in New England, Cronin is a graduate of Harvard University and the Iowa Writers’ Workshop. He taught creative writing and was the "Author in-residence" at La Salle University in Philadelphia, Pennsylvania, from 1992 to 2003. He is a former professor of English at Rice University, and he lives with his wife and children in Houston, Texas.

In July 2017, Variety reported that Fox 2000 had bought the screen rights to Cronin's vampire trilogy. The first book of the series, The Passage, was released in June 2010. It garnered mainly favorable reviews. The book has been adapted by Fox into a television series, with Cronin credited as a co-producer.

Bibliography

 A Short History of the Long Ball (1990)
 Mary and O'Neil (2001) – Winner of the PEN/Hemingway Award and The Stephen Crane Prize from Book of the Month Club
 The Summer Guest (2004)
 The Passage (2010) (Book 1 of The Passage Trilogy)
 The Twelve (2012) (Book 2 of The Passage Trilogy)
 The City of Mirrors (2016) (Book 3 of The Passage Trilogy)

References

External links

Profile at The Whiting Foundation
 An Interview with Justin Cronin at Rollins College (February 2014)
 An Interview With Justin Cronin on KRUI's The Lit Show

20th-century American novelists
Harvard University alumni
Iowa Writers' Workshop alumni
Living people
Rice University faculty
1962 births
Pew Fellows in the Arts
21st-century American novelists
American horror novelists
Hemingway Foundation/PEN Award winners
American male novelists
Writers from Philadelphia
20th-century American male writers
21st-century American male writers
Novelists from Pennsylvania
Novelists from Texas